The 2006 Scott Tournament of Hearts, the Canadian women's curling championship, was held at the John Labatt Centre in London, Ontario, February 25, 2006 – March 6, 2006. The tournament consists of 12 teams, one from each of Canada's provinces, one from Canada's territories and the defending champion, whose team is known as Team Canada. The tournament was the 25th anniversary of the Hearts. The winner would be Kelly Scott's British Columbia rink who defeated the defending champions, Jennifer Jones in the final.

Teams
Representing Team Canada was the defending champion, Jennifer Jones rink but with a change at lead position with 2002 Olympic bronze medallist Georgina Wheatcroft. Making her 21st appearance at the Scotts was Colleen Jones who skipped the Nova Scotia team. Colleen Jones had won the Scotts six times. 1998 Champion Cathy King skipped Team Alberta. Making her fourth appearance at the Scotts was Suzanne Gaudet from Prince Edward Island, a two time Canadian Junior Champion and 2001 World Junior Champion. Making her first appearance at the Scotts was Andrea Kelly from New Brunswick, the 2005 Canadian Junior Champion. Returning from 2005 was the Northwest Territories/Yukon team skipped by Kerry Koe- Koe made her fourth appearance at the Scotts. Also returning was Kelly Scott, from British Columbia, the 1995 World Junior Champion who made her second appearance. Another skip returning from 2005 was Heather Strong from Newfoundland and Labrador who made her sixth appearance. Making an appearance at the Scotts for the first time since 1997 was Janet Harvey of Manitoba, attending her third event. Debuting at the Scotts, along with Kelly from New Brunswick was Eve Bélisle from Quebec, Krista Scharf from Ontario and Tracy Streifel from Saskatchewan. 

Only alternates who have played are shown

Standings

Results
All times are Eastern Standard Time.

Draw 1February 25, 2:30 PM ET 

Draw 2February 25, 7:00 PM ETDraw 3February 26, 10:00 AM ETDraw 4February 26, 2:30 PM ETDraw 5February 26, 7:00 PM ETDraw 6February 27, 9:30 AM ETDraw 7February 27, 2:00 PM ETDraw 8February 27, 7:00 PM ETDraw 9February 28, 9:30 AM ETDraw 10February 28, 2:00 PM ETDraw 11February 28, 7:00 PM ETDraw 12March 1, 9:30 AM ETDraw 13March 1, 2:00 PM ETDraw 14March 1, 7:00 PM ETDraw 15March 2, 8:30 AM ETDraw 16March 2, 1:00 PM ETDraw 17March 2, 7:00 PM ETTiebreaker March 3, 8:30 AM ETPlayoffs

1 vs. 2March 3, 1:00 PM ET3 vs. 4 gameMarch 3, 7:00 PM ETSemi-finalMarch 4, 1:00 PM ETFinalMarch 5, 12:30 PM ETTop Percentages(After Round Robin. Five best players from each position)Qualifying
Bold indicates winner. Italics'' indicated defending provincial champion

Tie-breaker
Bryden 13-4 Rumberg

Playoffs:
Semi-final: Sonnenberg 6-3 Bryden
Final: King 8-2 Sonnenberg

Event held at the Shamrock Curling Club in Edmonton January 24–29

Playoffs:
Semi-final: Wells 8-6 Mallett
Final: Scott 8-5 Wells

Event held at the Williams Lake Curling Club in Williams Lake January 25–29.

Tie-breakers:
Fowler 5-3 Cripps
Jenion 7-3 Fowler
Streich 11-4 Spencer

Play-offs
Red2 vs Black2: Jenion 5-4 Streich
Red1 vs Black1: Harvey 6-5 Porritt
Semi-final: Jenion 7-8 Porritt
Final: Harvey 9-3 Jenion

Event held at the C.A. Nesbitt Arena in Thompson January 25–29.

Defending Manitoba champion, Jennifer Jones won the 2005 Scott Tournament of Hearts, meaning she will get an automatic bye to the championships and did not have to go through qualifying. 

Tie-breaker
Hanlon 8-4 Comeau

Playoffs
Semi-final: Hanlon 10-8 Adams
Final: Kelly 8-7 Hanlon

Event held at Curling Beauséjour, Inc. in Moncton January 25–29

Playoffs
Semi-final: Cunningham 6-4 Thomas
Final (Strong needs to be defeated twice): Cunningham 9-6 Strong; Strong 6-5 Cunningham

Event held at the Corner Brook Rec Plex in Corner Brook January 25–29

Tie-breaker
Mouzar 8-7 Palmer

Playoffs
Semi-final: Zinck 9-8 Mouzar
Final: Jones 9-8 Zinck

Colleen Jones represented Team Canada at the 2005 Scott Tournament of Hearts because she had won it in 2004.

Event held at the Highlander Curling Club in St. Andrews January 25–29.

 

Playoffs
3 vs. 4: Bodogh 9-8 Hanna
1 vs. 2: Scharf 5-4 McGhee
Semi-final: McGhee 8-5 Bodogh
Final: Scharf 7-6 McGhee

Event held at the Fort Frances Curling Club in Fort Frances January 29-February 4

Playoffs
Semi-final: Bradley 7-6 O'Rourke
Final: Gaudet 11-3 Bradley

Event held at the Maple Leaf Curling Club in O'Leary January 19–22.

The defending champion, Rebecca Jean MacPhee played third for O'Rourke

Tie-breaker
 Belisle 5-4 Lanthier

Playoffs
A1 vs. B1 game: Osborne 8-7 Larouche
Quarter-final: Belisle 7-4 Frappier
Semi-final: Belisle 8-5 Larouche
Final: Belisle 7-5 Osborne

Event held at the Club de curling Victoria in Quebec City January 15–22.

The defending champion, Brenda Nicholls played third for Berthelot

Tie-breaker
Syrota 6-5 Birnie

Playoffs
Semi-final: Syrota 6-5 Lawton
Final: Streifel 7-5 Syrota

Event held at the Yorkton Curling Club in Yorkton February 1–5.

No playoffs or tie-breakers necessary.

Event held at the Yellowknife Curling Club in Yellowknife January 26–29

Notes

References

External links
Official web site

Scott Tournament Of Hearts, 2006
Scotties Tournament of Hearts
Scott Tournament of Hearts
Sports competitions in London, Ontario
Curling in Ontario
2006 in women's curling